Mayabazar: Music from the Motion Picture is the soundtrack album of the 1957 Indian bilingual film of the same name which was simultaneously shot in Telugu and Tamil. Ghantasala composed the album and the background score for the film. The soundtrack album features 12 tracks, whose lyrics were penned by Pingali Nagendrarao and Thanjai N. Ramaiah Dass for the Telugu and Tamil versions respectively.

Development 
After writing the music for four songs – "Srikarulu Devathalu", "Lahiri Lahiri", "Choopulu Kalisina Subhavela" and "Neekosame" – S. Rajeswara Rao left the project. Following his departure, Ghantasala orchestrated and recorded Rajeswara Rao's compositions with N. C. Sen Gupta and A. Krishnamurthy, and composed the rest of the film's score.

The soundtrack album has 12 songs with lyrics by Pingali Nagendrarao and Thanjai N. Ramaiah Dass for the Telugu and Tamil versions, respectively, and was mixed by A. Krishnan and Siva Ram. The album was engineered by N. C. Sen Gupta and orchestrated by A. Krishnamurthy. Distributed by HMV, the album's cover depicts S. V. Ranga Rao as Ghatotkacha.

P. Leela said in an interview that one of her songs took 28 takes to record, and her fifth song was finished by Ghantasala. "Lahiri Lahiri" ("Aaga Inba Nilavinile" in Tamil) was based on the Mohanam raga.

"Vivaha Bhojanambu" ("Kalyana Samayal Saadham" in Tamil) was heavily based on lyrics from Surabhi Nataka Samajam's 1950s plays, which were influenced by 1940s Janaki Sapadham harikatha records by B. Nagarajakumari. Nagarajakumari was inspired by a song written by Gali Penchala Narasimha Rao for Sasirekha Parinayam (1936), directed by P. V. Das. That song's melody was inspired by Charles Penrose's 1922 song "The Laughing Policeman", written by Penrose under the pseudonym of Charles Jolly.

Track listing

Notes

References 

1957 soundtrack albums
Telugu film soundtracks